Prempur Gunahi is a village development committee in Rautahat District in the Narayani Zone of south-eastern Nepal. At the time of the 1991 Nepal census it had a population of 5748.

References

Prempur Gonahi

Populated places in Rautahat District